Walter Boyce (born 25 October 1946) is a Canadian former rally racer. He is the only Canadian to win a World Rally Championship event, which he managed at the 1973 Press-on-Regardless Rally in the United States. He took his second podium finish at the 1974 Rally of the Rideau Lakes in his home country, finishing third behind Sandro Munari and Simo Lampinen. Boyce was inducted into the Canadian Motorsport Hall of Fame in 2003.

References

1946 births
Canadian rally drivers
Living people
World Rally Championship drivers